Jailton is a Portuguese given name. Jailton may refer to:

Dinda (born 1972), Jailton dos Santos, Brazilian football midfielder
Jailton (footballer, born 1974), Jailton Nunes de Oliveira, Brazilian football midfielder
Jaílton (footballer, born 1982), Paulo Jaílton da Cruz Alves, Brazilian football midfielder
Kuca (footballer) (born 1989), Jaílton Alves Miranda, Cape Verdean football forward
Jaílton Paraíba (born 1990), Jaílton Lourenço da Silva, Brazilian football winger